Ibeno is located in the south south of Nigeria and is a Local Government Area of Akwa Ibom State.
Ibeno lies in the Mangrove Forest Belt of the Niger Delta region of Nigeria, bounded to the west by Eastern Obolo Local Government Area, to the north by Onna, Esit Eket and Eket, and to the south by the Atlantic Ocean.

Location 
Ibeno Local Government Area is located at the south end of Akwa Ibom State, occupying a vast coastal area of over 1,200 km2. . It is bounded in the south by the Atlantic Ocean and shares borders with Eket, Esit Eket, Onna and Eastern Obolo local government areas...

History 
Ibeno Local Government Area was created out of the defunct Uquo-Ibeno Local Government Area on December 4, 1996, by the Federal government instrument.

Before the creation of Uquo-Ibeno Local Government Area, the people of Ibeno were in Eket Local Government Area – Ibeno Edoh, Uquo Ibeno respectively. Ibeno Local Government Area has thus graduated from being part of Eket Local Government area to part of Ibeno-Edor with headquarters at Inua-Eyet Ikot Ibeno (now defunct) to being part of Uquo Ibeno with headquarters at Uquo (now headquarters of Esit Eket Local Government Area) to a distinct and separate local government area, Ibeno Local Government Area with headquarters at Upenekang. It is one of the 31 local government areas in Akwa Ibom State.

Geography 
Ibeno occupies the largest Atlantic coastline, more than 129 km, in Akwa Ibom State.

Located in the mangrove swamp forest, the area has rain throughout the year with the peak between May and September. The climatic condition in Ibeno is favorable all year round for fishing and farming.

Ibeno Beach, the longest in West Africa, is a popular tourist attraction.

Language 
The people speak Ibeno dialect of the Efik–Ibibio-Andoni language. The need to establish trade links with the Efik people meant that the Andoni people that settled in present-day Ibeno had to coin the language to suit. The people of Ibeno are of Oron–Efik extraction.

Commerce 
The prime occupation of the people is fishing. However, farming and petty trading enjoy appreciative notice. The presence of oil exploration activities by oil giant Exxon Mobil and other service companies influence activities both upstream and downstream.

Culture 
Ibeno people are rich in cultural heritage. The people have many age-long traditional institutions like Ekpe, Obon, Uke, Ekong, Akata, Eka-Ebitu, Ubom Isong, Oluo, Ikini and the age-grade system (Nka) which is highly recognized and practised in Ibeno.

People 
Ibeno people are ancestrally related to the Andoni people and Oron people in origin. The common dialect of Ibeno people is the Ibeno language, prominently spoken by Ibeno and Eastern Obolo people in Akwa Ibom State. The people also enjoy an active aquatic life.

Population

References

http://www.helloakwaibom.com/ibeno-lga/ Hello Akwa-Ibom

Local Government Areas in Akwa Ibom State
Towns in Akwa Ibom State
Populated coastal places in Nigeria
Fishing communities in Nigeria